The 8th Plague is the debut full-length album of the Spanish extreme metal act Hybrid.

The album was recorded between June and July 2007 at Sadman Studio (One Last Word, Ictvs, Adrift) in Madrid by Carlos Santos and mastered by Alan Douches (Suffocation, Mastodon) at West West Side Music (New York). The album artwork was created by Seldon Hunt (Neurosis, Isis, Melvins).

The album was released on August 8, 2008 through London-based label Eyesofsound (Behold... The Arctopus, Dysrythmia, Yakuza).

Track listing 

I. Ovum: Alienation
"Hundred Years Ocean" – 4:46
"Soul Prolapse" – 4:28
"Sleep of the Defeated" – 3:57

II. Larva: Narcotization
"Post-Traumatic Stress Disorder" – 4:14
"Sun Burnt" – 2:41

III. Chrysallis: Transformation
"Cocoon/Metamorphosis/Eclosion" – 3:48

IV. Imago: Obliteration
"The Omega Swarm" – 3:54
"Ashes of Babylon" – 9:38

Personnel 
 Albano Fortes – vocals
 J. Oliver – guitar, backing vocals
 Miguel – guitar, backing vocals
 Kike – bass
 Chus Maestro – drums, backing vocals

External links 
 Hybrid at Encyclopaedia Metallum
 Hybrid at Last.fm

Hybrid (Spanish band) albums
2008 debut albums